A crevasse splay is a sedimentary fluvial deposit which forms when a stream breaks its natural or artificial levees and deposits sediment on a floodplain. A breach that forms a crevasse splay deposits sediments in similar pattern to an alluvial fan deposit. Once the levee has been breached the water flows out of its channel. As the water spreads onto the flood plain sediments will start to fall out of suspension as the water loses energy. The resulting deposition can create graded deposits similar to those found in Bouma sequences. In some cases crevasse splays can cause a river to abandon its old river channel, a process known as avulsion. Breaches that form a crevasse splay deposits occur most commonly on the outside banks of meanders where the water has the highest energy. Crevasse splay deposits can range in size.

See also

References

External links
A crevasse splay along the Columbia River

Rivers
Fluvial landforms